Rear-Admiral The Hon. Arthur Lionel Ochoncar Forbes-Sempill (24 September 1877– 9 May 1962) was a Scottish officer of the Royal Navy active in the First World War.

Biography

Arthur was the fourth son and youngest child of William Forbes-Sempill, 17th Lord Sempill and Frances Emily Abercromby, daughter of Sir Robert Abercromby (or his father Sir George Abercromby). His three elder brothers,  John, Douglas and Robert, all served in the Army.

First World War

In July 1914 he was assigned to HMS Dominion, in which he served during the early part of the First World War. He was later posted as executive officer of the battleship , where he saw service at the Battle of Jutland, and was recommended for promotion to Captain as a result. He later commanded the cruisers HMS Blonde and HMS Cordelia, and was present in the latter at the surrender of the German navy in 1918. By 1919, he was in command of HMS Colossus.

Personal life
He married Muriel Emily ("Molly") Spencer in 1903 (daughter of The Rev. Walter Spencer and sister of Margery Greenwood, Viscountess Greenwood), and was divorced in July 1914, on the grounds of adultery; the case was not defended. His ex-wife remarried Wilfrid Ashley, 1st Baron Mount Temple. He remarried in 1919, to Helen Mabel Allen, daughter of Major John Allen, of Brackley House; she died shortly thereafter, in 1921. He remarried for a third time in 1926, to Mary Holland, an American. He had one daughter from his second marriage, Janet, and one son by his third marriage, John Alexander, who would later inherit the baronetcy held by Arthur's father, after it had passed through his elder brother John and his nephews William and then Ewan.

He died at his home in Wigtownshire on 9 May 1962.

References

1877 births
1962 deaths
Royal Navy rear admirals
Royal Navy officers of World War I
People from Aberdeenshire
Arthur
Younger sons of barons